Aleksei Vitalyevich Savelyev (born 10 April 1977) is a retired Russian professional footballer.

Club career
He made his debut in the Russian Premier League in 1994 for FC Torpedo Moscow.

Honours
 Russian Premier League runner-up: 1998.
 Russian Premier League bronze: 1999.
 Russian Cup finalist: 2000.

European competition history
 UEFA Cup 1996–97 with FC Torpedo Moscow: 4 games.
 UEFA Cup 2000–01 with PFC CSKA Moscow: 1 game.

References

External links
 

1977 births
Living people
Russian footballers
Russia youth international footballers
Russia under-21 international footballers
Association football midfielders
Russian expatriate footballers
Expatriate footballers in Ukraine
Expatriate footballers in Kazakhstan
Expatriate footballers in Belarus
Russian Premier League players
Ukrainian Premier League players
FC Torpedo Moscow players
FC Torpedo-2 players
PFC CSKA Moscow players
FC Lokomotiv Nizhny Novgorod players
FC Saturn Ramenskoye players
FC Anzhi Makhachkala players
FC Vorskla Poltava players
FC Tobol players
FC Dynamo Bryansk players
FC Salyut Belgorod players
FC Vitebsk players